Richard of England may refer to:

Richard I of England (1157–1199), King of England from 1189
Richard II of England (1367–), King of England from 1377 to 1399
Richard III of England (1452–1485), King of England from 1483

See also
King Richard (disambiguation)
Prince Richard (disambiguation)
Ricardus Anglicus (disambiguation)